Rita and Friends is a Canadian television variety show, which aired on CBC Television from 1994 to 1997. The show was hosted by Canadian country/folk singer Rita MacNeil. It won a Gemini Award in 1996 for 'Best Performance in a Variety Program or Series' and featured many musical artists.

MacNeil's folksy style made the show more popular with Canadian audiences than the show it replaced, Friday Night with Ralph Benmergui.

References 

1. Canada's Awards Database

1990s Canadian variety television series
CBC Television original programming
1994 Canadian television series debuts
1997 Canadian television series endings
1990s Canadian music television series